Sultan Al-Johani  [سلطان الجهني in Arabic] (born 26 February 1992) is a Saudi footballer who plays as a defender .

References

External links 
 

1992 births
Living people
Saudi Arabian footballers
Al-Wehda Club (Mecca) players
Al-Tai FC players
Al-Watani Club players
Al-Qaisumah FC players
Najran SC players
Al Jandal Club players
Hajer FC players
Saudi First Division League players
Saudi Professional League players
Saudi Second Division players
Association football defenders